George Johnson House, also known as White Castle House, is a historic home located at Lexington, Lafayette County, Missouri.  It was built about 1894, and is a -story, Queen Anne style frame dwelling.  It has a cross-gable plan and features a one-story, wraparound verandah. Also on the property is the contributing two-story building used as a summer kitchen and servant quarters. style

It was listed on the National Register of Historic Places in 1993.

References

Houses on the National Register of Historic Places in Missouri
Queen Anne architecture in Missouri
Houses completed in 1894
Houses in Lafayette County, Missouri
National Register of Historic Places in Lafayette County, Missouri